Jagdish Joshi (born 1937-2016) is an Indian children's book illustrator. Born 1937, he studied fine arts at the Indian College Of Arts And Draftsmanship, Dum Dum, Kolkata and later worked for the Hindustan Times and Children's Book Trust. He also illustrated several books for the National Book Trust, and remained "one of most sought after" illustrators in children's literature in India, through the 1990s.

In 1998, he was a nominee for the Hans Christian Andersen Award, sometimes known as the "Nobel Prize for children's literature", is an international award given biennially by the International Board on Books for Young People (IBBY) in recognition of a "lasting contribution to children's literature".

Work

As Illustrator
A Voice in the Jungle (1986) by Jagdish Joshi(National Book Trust)
Barber at the Zoo by Pratibha Nath (Children's Book Trust, 1984)
How Munia Found Gold (1984) by Jagdish Joshi(National Book Trust)
One Day (1999) by Jagdish Joshi (National Book Trust)
Search by Arvind Krishna Mehrotra (1991)
The Kaziranga Trail by Arup Kumar Dutta (1978)
South Indian Legends by Maya Thomas and Alaka Shankar (Children's Book Trust, 1980)

References

External links
Jagdish Joshi page at WorldCat

Indian illustrators
1937 births
Living people
Indian children's book illustrators
Recipients of the Sahitya Akademi Award in Gujarati